The following is a list of documented weather events, sorted by year and by type. It includes tropical cyclones, tornadoes, windstorms, and snowstorms.

Table of weather events

See also

Notes

References

Weather by year